Borzabad or Barzabad may refer to:
 Barzabad, Isfahan
 Borzabad, Isfahan
 Borzabad, Markazi
 Borzabad, North Khorasan